Serhiy Mykolayovych Nahornyak (born 5 September 1971) is a Ukrainian professional football coach and a former player.

Club career
Nahornyak started his career at local amateur but well established football club Intehral playing at regional level. He made his debut at professional level in April 1993 in the Ukrainian First League for FC Vorskla Poltava playing against FC Avtomobilist Sumy. In the Ukrainian Premier League Nahornyak debuted for FC Nyva Vinnytsia on 8 August 1993 against FC Torpedo Zaporizhia.

In 1995 another Podolianyn Vyacheslav Hrozny invited him to FC Spartak Moscow, but Nahornyak struggled to stay in the first squad and later after dismissal of Hrozny from Spartak joined FC Dnipro Dnipropetrovsk, with which reached the 1997 Ukrainian Cup Final yielding the main trophy on penalties to FC Shakhtar Donetsk.

He played a game in the 1995–96 UEFA Champions League for FC Spartak Moscow in a 2:2 tie against FC Nantes Atlantique. Later Nahornyak also represented FC Dnipro and FC Shakhtar Donetsk in UEFA Europa League recording 5 games in total for this continental cup.

Honours
 Russian Premier League champion: 1996.
 Russian Cup finalist: 1996.
 Ukrainian Premier League runner-up: 1999.
 Ukrainian Premier League bronze: 1996, 1998.
 Ukrainian Cup finalist: 1997, 2006.

References

External links

1971 births
Living people
Footballers from Vinnytsia
Ukrainian footballers
Ukrainian expatriate footballers
Ukraine international footballers
FC Vorskla Poltava players
FC Nyva Vinnytsia players
FC Polissya Zhytomyr players
FC Spartak Moscow players
FC Dnipro players
FC Metalurh Novomoskovsk players
FC Shakhtar Donetsk players
FC Shakhtar-2 Donetsk players
Changsha Ginde players
Shandong Taishan F.C. players
FC Arsenal Kyiv players
Jiangsu F.C. players
China League One players
FC Volyn Lutsk players
FC Metalurh Zaporizhzhia players
FC Irpin Horenychi players
Expatriate footballers in China
Expatriate footballers in Russia
Russian Premier League players
Ukrainian Premier League players
Ukrainian First League players
Ukrainian Second League players
Doping cases in association football
Ukrainian sportspeople in doping cases
Ukrainian football managers
Ukrainian expatriate sportspeople in China
Ukrainian expatriate sportspeople in Russia
Association football midfielders
Association football forwards